Banihal Tunnel may refer to:

 Jawahar Tunnel
 Pir Panjal Railway Tunnel